Canning is a civil parish in Queens County, New Brunswick, Canada.

For governance purposes it was divided (before 2023) between the village of Minto and the local service district of the parish of Canning, both of which were members of Regional Service Commission 11 (RSC11).

Origin of name
The parish was probably named in honour of George Canning, British Secretary of State for Foreign Affairs and Leader of the House of Commons at the time. Shortly after the parish's erection Canning became Prime Minister of the United Kingdom.

History
Canning was erected in 1827 from Waterborough Parish.

In 1835 the northwestern part of Canning was included in the newly erected Chipman Parish.

Boundaries
Canning is bounded:

 on the northeast by a line beginning on the Sunbury County line about 400 metres north-northeasterly of Minto, then running east-southeasterly for about 1.2 km before turning to run south 45º east to Salmon Bay, then in a direct line to Indian Point, then into the Northeast Arm of Grand Lake;
 on the southeast by a line through Grand Lake, passing through Northeast Arm and west of Goat Island, then through the isthmus to the Saint John River, passing east of the Route 2 interchange with Route 105 and Conservation Road;
 on the southwest by the Saint John River;
 on the northwest by the Sunbury County line.

Communities
Communities at least partly within the parish. bold indicates an incorporated municipality

 Clarks Corners
 Douglas Harbour
 Flowers Cove
 Maquapit Lake
 Newcastle Centre
 Newcastle Creek
 Princess Park
 Scotchtown
  Minto
 Newcastle Bridge
 Rothwell
 South Minto

Bodies of water
Bodies of water at least partly within the parish.

 Grand Lake Little River
  Saint John River
 Baltimore Stream
 Main Thoroughfare
 Newcastle Creek
 Otter Creek
 Coys Gut
 Back Lake
 Lower Timber Lake
 Maquapit Lake
 The Keyhole
  Grand Lake
 Douglas Harbour
 Newcastle Bay
 Northeast Arm
 Salmon Bay

Islands
Islands at least partly within the parish.
 Hunters Island
 Marshalls Island
 Thatch Island
 Grand Point Bar

Other notable places
Parks, historic sites, and other noteworthy places at least partly within the parish.
 Grand Lake Protected Natural Area
 Pickerel Pond Nature Preserve

Demographics
Parish population total does not portion within former incorporated village of Minto. Revised census figures based on the 2023 local governance reforms have not been released.

Population
Population trend

Language
Mother tongue (2016)

Access Routes
Highways and numbered routes that run through the parish, including external routes that start or finish at the parish limits:

 Highways
 

 Principal Routes
 

 Secondary Routes:
 

 External Routes:
 None

See also
 List of parishes in New Brunswick

Notes

References

Parishes of Queens County, New Brunswick
Local service districts of Queens County, New Brunswick